Revolution in Me is the debut solo album by Siobhán Donaghy, on 29 September 2003. The album debuted, and peaked, at #117 on the UK Albums Chart. Her forename is stylised as 'Siobhan' for this album, as opposed to the correct styling of 'Siobhán'. The album was reviewed well in European countries, including Sweden and Finland. The album was released with the Copy Control protection system in some regions. Two singles were released from the album: "Overrated" and "Twist of Fate".

Track listing

Notes
 The album's title, Revolution in Me, is said to relate to Siobhán Donaghy's departure from Sugababes.
 "Nothing But Song" was released as a promotional single on vinyl under the name of "Shanghai Nobody", an anagram of "Siobhán Donaghy".
 As the booklet includes eight additional front covers, there is no official album cover, as anyone can change the cover.
 Interviewed on BBC Three's Liquid News show around the time of the release of "Twist of Fate", Siobhan mentioned the turkeys in the video, and said that they were more relevant to her upcoming Christmas single, "Iodine". However, no further single was released.

Charts

References

2003 debut albums
Albums produced by Cameron McVey
Siobhán Donaghy albums